Brazilian Air Force One is the Brazilian Air Force call sign of the aircraft carrying the President of Brazil. On international flights the aircraft uses the Brazilian Air Force ICAO code BRS1 and callsign  Brazilian Air Force 01. The Special Transport Group (GTE) is the unit of the Brazilian Air Force responsible for transporting the President, Vice-President and other senior government officials.

Main aircraft (VC-1A)
The main presidential aircraft currently used to transport the President of Brazil is a modified version of the Airbus A319, with tail number 2101. It was designated by the Brazilian Air Force as VC-1A, and officially christened as the "Santos-Dumont", after the Brazilian aviation pioneer. It is used to transport the President on all medium and long-range international flights.

Cabin configuration and security

The VC-1A differs from standard A319 in features and security configuration. The cabin is divided into three separate sections. The first section (near the cockpit) is the presidential area of the aircraft, configured with a private office, a presidential suite, a meeting room and a security office. The middle section is configured with first-class seats reserved for authorities and senior staff. The rear section is configured with 20 business-class seats reserved for journalists and other passengers. The aircraft is also equipped with an Intensive Care Unit, three galleys and satellite communications.

The aircraft was designed to serve as an airborne command post, allowing the president to fully conduct his, or her duties from the air in the event of political instability or armed conflict. For that purpose, the plane is equipped with a number of military defense capabilities, such as anti-aircraft missile countermeasures and a Radar Warning Receiver. To guarantee the protection of classified and sensitive information, the aircraft is linked with the "SISCOMIS" (Brazilian Military Communications Satellite) which can be used to transfer data, image and voice between the aircraft and Brasília.

Possible replacement
In July 2012 anonymous sources leaked that President Dilma Rousseff authorized the Brazilian Air Force to talk with Boeing about the purchase of a B-747 widebody, similar to the United States's Air Force One, as replacement for the A-319 as main Presidential Aircraft. Among the reasons for this early replacement of a still relatively young aircraft is the limited range of the present plane, which does not allow direct flights from Brasília to countries such as India and China, as well as recent mechanical problems of present aircraft.

Intercontinental aircraft (KC-30)

From 2022, the Brazilian Air Force introduced two military converted Airbus A330-200 called KC-30 to its inventory, in order to reinforce the strategic operations, the first international trip with the model was in February 2023 to the United States, by President Luiz Inácio Lula da Silva.

Secondary aircraft (VC-2)

Two modified Embraer 190 jets, Air Force designation VC-2, christened as "Bartolomeu de Gusmão" and "Augusto Severo", are used for presidential travel within Brazil and South America. The Brazilian Air Force purchased the aircraft on 2 June 2008 to replace the two Boeing 737-2N3 (VC-96) that were previously used for short-range presidential transport. Comfort, safety, performance and technology were the priorities for choosing the new Embraer jets. The aircraft is configured with special communications systems, a private presidential office and a meeting room. It has the capacity for carrying 40 passengers with a range of over 2,500 miles.

Other aircraft
Along with the VC-1A and the VC-2s, 21 other aircraft are part of the fleet:

 Two VIP-configured Eurocopter EC725 (VH-36) presidential helicopter.
 Two VIP-configured Eurocopter Super Puma (VH-34) presidential helicopters.
 Two VIP-configured Embraer ERJ-145 (VC-99C) aircraft.
 Ten Embraer ERJ-145 (C-99A) jets.

 Three Gates Learjet 35 (VU-35) jets.
 Two Eurocopter EC135 (VH-35) helicopters

The VIP fleet is stationed at Brasília Air Force Base (BABR) and operated by the Special Transportation Group (GTE).

Former aircraft
Former aircraft used for transportation of the President of Brazil:

See also
 Air Force One
 Air transports of heads of state and government
 Brazilian Presidential Helicopter
 Russian presidential aircraft – Official aircraft of the President of Russia

Notes

References

External links

Brazilian Air Force VC-1A technical stats and photos 
Spotter: Grupo de Transporte Especial Information and photos 
Defesa Brasil: FAB 001 VC-1A and VC-2 information and photos 

Brazilian Air Force
Presidential aircraft
Vehicles of Brazil